Polish Expedition to Kiev may refer to one of the following events:

 Boleslaw I's intervention in the Kievan succession crisis, 1018, a Polish intervention into who would be ruler of Kiev and the state of Kievan Rus'
 Kiev Offensive (1920), an attempt by Poland, led by Józef Piłsudski, to seize central and eastern Ukraine from Soviet control

See also
 Battle of Kyiv (disambiguation)